Serbów  is a village in the administrative district of Gmina Rzepin, within Słubice County, Lubusz Voivodeship, in western Poland.

The village has a population of 270.

References

Villages in Słubice County